The McKendree Bearcats are the intercollegiate athletic programs that represent McKendree University, located in Lebanon, Illinois, United States, in intercollegiate sports as a member of the Division II level of the National Collegiate Athletic Association (NCAA), primarily competing in the Great Lakes Valley Conference (GLVC) as a provisional member since the 2012–13 academic year.

Prior to joining the NCAA, the Bearcats previously competed in the National Association of Intercollegiate Athletics (NAIA) as members of the American Midwest Conference (with the exception of football where they played in the Midwest League of the Mid-States Football Association (MSFA)) from 1987–88 to 2010–11, as well as an NAIA/NCAA Division II Independent during the 2011–12 school year. They also competed in the Illinois Intercollegiate Athletic Conference (IIAC) from 1912–13 to 1937–38.

Varsity teams
McKendree competes in 39 intercollegiate varsity sports: Men's sports include baseball, basketball, bowling, cross country, football, golf, ice hockey (DI and DII), powerlifting, rugby, soccer, swimming & diving, tennis, track & field, volleyball, water polo and wrestling; while women's sports include basketball, beach volleyball, bowling, cross country, golf, ice hockey, lacrosse, powerlifting, rugby, soccer, softball, swimming & diving, tennis, track & field, volleyball, water polo and wrestling; and co-ed sports include bass fishing, cheerleading and dance.

Men's basketball
McKendree's men's former basketball coach, Harry Statham, at one point held the all-time record for wins at a four-year institution. On February 16, 2019, this record was broken by Duke University head coach Mike Krzyzewski. Statham's 1,122 wins during his 52 seasons at McKendree were previously unmatched by any other basketball coach at a four-year college or university in the United States.

Bowling
The McKendree University bowling team is headed by Shannon and Bryan O'Keefe. Shannon played softball up through high school and won the All-American award as a center fielder. She went to Portland State University and began to input herself in the amateur status. Bryan went to University of Nebraska and took many coaching classes. Shannon has been on bowling's Team USA for 15 years, and has won over 20 professional titles, including 14 on the PWBA Tour. Bryan was never much of a professional bowler, however was very passionate about coaching, and because of that landed himself a place in the Bowling Hall of Fame as one of the top coaches of the decade. Since their placement at McKendree University the bowling teams, together, have increased their overall average by 12 pins. They came to McKendree in the 2014–2015 school year to coach the men and women's programs. Under their supervision the men and women both went to the National Collegiate Bowling Competition. The women placed fifth and the men placed sixth. The 2016 men's team won the USBC national championship while the women's team won the 2017 NCAA National Championship, sweeping perennial powerhouse Nebraska 4–0 on April 15, 2017. A month later, the women's team also won the 2017 USBC Intercollegiate Team Championships held in Baton Rouge, Louisiana, completing a sweep of the two major college competitions. On April 16, 2022, the women's team won its second national championship, sweeping Stephen F. Austin 4–0 in the 2022 NCAA Bowling Championships.

References